Blyew v. United States (1871), was a court case that originated in Lewis County, Kentucky, where the U.S. Supreme Court upheld the states right to forbid African Americans to testify against White people.

History 
On August 29, 1868, two White men by the names of John Blyew and George Kennard entered the house of the Foster family, an African American home in Lewis County, Kentucky. The two white men had a female with them, and they were arguing with the Foster family insisting they needed to house the woman. The two White men attacked the family with an axe; four African-Americans died and many were injured, including children.  

The was a case heard before the U.S. Supreme Court in April 1872 addressing the civil rights of African Americans, as well as states' rights issues. The case involved the testimony of African-American victims of the attack. Kentucky state law prohibited the testimony of a "Negro" against a White man and barred African Americans from serving on juries. The case was eventually moved to Federal court, where the attackers were convicted. The State of Kentucky then appealed the case to the Supreme Court citing states' rights in defense of its laws prohibiting African Americans from testifying against whites. The case was a test of the Civil Rights Act of 1866. The Supreme Court ruled that victims were not entitled to protection from the state law because the word "affected" in the law did not apply to victims of crimes who are not defendants in a case. Noah Swayne (the first Republican appointed to the Supreme Court) and Joseph Bradley dissented. 

Civil rights legislation was subsequently modified and comments in the dissent are noted for putting forth a group right to the adequate protection of the law. Justice William Strong wrote that any case involving an African American witness could be brought to a Federal Court if the court had ruled for the victims and upheld the right of African Americans to testify in court.

References

Further reading
The Family of Jack and Sallie Foster, Blyew v. United States,” Notable Kentucky African Americans Database, accessed March 7, 2018

Blyew v. United States, 80 U.S. 13 Wall. 581 (1871) 

1872 in United States case law
States' rights